DanCenter is a vacation rental marketplace listing more than 10,000 properties in Scandinavia and northern Germany. It is also the operator of 28 holiday resorts 28 holiday in Denmark resorts under the Danland brand.

History
The company was founded by Danmarks Turistråd (now VisitDenmark) as Dansk Centralkontor for Sommerhusudlejning in 1957. Its first CEO was Kurt Holmsted who later became its owner through the company Land & Leisure A/S. Land & Leisure A/S was sold to the Dutch company @Leisure in 2016.

Operations
DanCenter has approximately 260 full-time employees of which 65 are based in the headquarters at Lyngbyvej in Copenhagen.

Danland holiday resorts
DanCenter operates 28 holiday resorts in Denmark in the following locations:

East Denmark
Bornholm
 Gudhjem

Falster
 Marielyst

Zealand
 Gilleleje
 Karrebæksminde

Funen
Funen
 Bogense
 Faaborg

Langeland
 Rudkøbing

Jutland
MNorth Jutland
 Agger Havn
 Blokhus
 Løkken
 Sæby
 Vigsø
 Skagen 

Central Jutland
 Bork Havn, West Coast
 Lemvig, West Coast
 Søndervig, West Coast
 Ebeltoft, East Coast
 Norddjurs, East Coast

South Jutland
 Fanø, West Coast
 Ho, West Coast
 Eømø, West Coast
 Gråsten
 Hejlsminde, East Coast
 Løjt, East Coast

References

External links
Official Website
Vacation Rentals

Vacation rental
Online marketplaces of Denmark
Danish companies established in 1957
Hospitality companies established in 1957
Hotel and leisure companies based in Copenhagen
Hospitality companies of Denmark
Companies based in Copenhagen Municipality